Yorkshire 5 was an English Rugby Union league at the eleventh tier of the domestic competition and was the basement league of club rugby in Yorkshire. This league was not always the bottom division as for a while there was a Yorkshire 6 but this league merged with Yorkshire 5. Also, for a short period, Yorkshire 5 was split into two parallel leagues based on geographical location.  Promoted teams moved up to Yorkshire 4.

At the end of the 2016-17 season Yorkshire 5 was abolished due to RFU changes to the Yorkshire league structure.  This restructuring would see Yorkshire 4 broken up into two regional leagues - Yorkshire 4 (North West) and Yorkshire 4 (South East) - with teams from both Yorkshire 4 and 5 transferred into these new leagues.

Participating Clubs 2016-17
Garforth
Knaresborough 
Mosborough (relegated from Yorkshire 4)
Rossington Hornets
Sheffield Oaks (relegated from Yorkshire 4)
Thirsk
Wibsey
Withernsea

Participating Clubs 2015-16
Garforth
Hallamshire
Hornsea (relegated from Yorkshire 4)
Knaresborough (relegated from Yorkshire 4)
Rossington Hornets
Stanley Rodillians
Thirsk
Wibsey

Participating Clubs 2014-15
Garforth	
Hallamshire	
Hessle (relegated from Yorkshire 4)
Rossington Hornets
Rotherham Clifton
Stanley Rodillians
Thirsk	
Wibsey

Participating Clubs 2013–14
Garforth
Hallamshire
Knaresborough - (relegated from Yorkshire 4)
Marist - (relegated from Yorkshire 4)
Rossington Hornets
Rotherham Clifton
Stanley Rodillians
Thirsk	
Wensleydale	
Wibsey

Participating Clubs 2012–13
Adwick Le Street
Doncaster Amateurs
Garforth
Rawmarsh
Rossington Hornets
Rotherham Clifton
Sheffield Oaks
Stanley Rodillians
Stocksbridge
Wensleydale
Wibsey

Clubs joining the League
As this is currently the basement league of club rugby in Yorkshire, any club wishing to join the rugby union club hierarchy must begin at the bottom so all Yorkshire-based teams start in Yorkshire 5 and these are the clubs who have been accepted into the league structure for the first time.

 2012-13: Doncaster Amateurs
 2013-14: Hallamshire, Thirsk
 2016-17: Withernsea

Original teams
When league rugby began in 1987 this division contained the following teams:

BP Chemicals
Halifax Vandals
Hornsea
Knaresborough
Leeds Corinthians
Old Rishworthians
Ossett
Phoenix Park
Rowntrees
Withernsea
Yorkshire Main

Yorkshire 5 Honours

Yorkshire 5 (1987–1993)

The original Yorkshire 5 was a tier 13 league with promotion up to Yorkshire 4 and relegation down to Yorkshire 6 until that division was cancelled at the end of the 1991–92 season.

Yorkshire 5 (1993–2000)

The creation of National 5 North for the 1993–94 season meant that Yorkshire 5 dropped to become a tier 14 league.  A further restructure at the end of the 1995–96 season, which included the cancellation of National 5 North and the addition of North East 3 at tier 9, saw Yorkshire 5 remain at tier 14.  During this period Yorkshire 6 (and relegation) was re-introduced in 1996-97, cancelled, and then re-introduced for the third time for the 1999–00 season.

Yorkshire 5 (2000–2004)

Northern league restructuring by the RFU at the end of the 1999-2000 season saw the cancellation of North East 1, North East 2 and North East 3 (tiers 7-9).  This meant that Yorkshire 5 became a tier 11 league.  Relegation continued to Yorkshire 6 until that division was abolished ahead of the 2003–04 season.

Yorkshire 5 North-East / South East (2004–2007)

For the 2004–05 season Yorkshire 5 was divided into two regional divisions - Yorkshire 5 North-West and Yorkshire 5 South East.

Yorkshire 5A / 5B (2007–2009)

For the 2007-08 season Yorkshire 5 switched from regional divisions into conferences - Yorkshire 5A and Yorkshire 5B.  Relegation returned with the reintroduction of Yorkshire 6 (for the fourth time) ahead of the 2009–10 season.

Yorkshire 5 (2009–2017)

Yorkshire 5 once more returned to being a single division from the 2009-10 season onward.  The cancellation of Yorkshire 6 after just one season meant that there was no relegation.  At the end of the 2016–17 season Yorkshire 5 was cancelled.

Promotion play-offs

Between 2005 and 2007 there was a play-off between the runners-up of Yorkshire 5 North-West and Yorkshire 5 South-West for the third and final promotion place to Yorkshire 4.  The team with the superior league record has home advantage in the tie.  At the end of the 2016–17 season Yorkshire 5 North-West have been the most successful winning all three games; and the away team has won promotion on two occasions compared to the home teams one.

For the 2007-08 season Yorkshire 5 was re-organized into non-geographical groups named Yorkshire 5A and Yorkshire 5B, with Yorkshire 5B being the most successful by winning the only playoff game played.  After the 2008-09 season Yorkshire 5 returned to a single division meaning that there have been no more play-offs since.

Number of league titles

Halifax Vandals (3)
Knaresborough (3)
Burley (2)
Hornsea (2)
Mosborough (2)
Sheffield Medicals (2)
Sheffield Oaks (2)
Stanley Rodillians (2)
Wakefield Cougars (2)
Wetherby (2)
Doncaster Amateurs (1)
Garforth (1)
Hemsworth (1)
Hessle (1)
Leeds Medics & Dentists (1)
Marist (1)
Old Rishworthians (1)
Ossett (1)
Rawmarsh (1)
Rotherham Clifton (1)
Skipton (1)
Wensleydale (1)
Wibsey (1)

Notes

See also
Yorkshire RFU
English rugby union system
Rugby union in England

References

Yorkshire 5
Rugby union competitions in Yorkshire